The 1988 Chatham Cup was the 61st annual nationwide knockout football competition in New Zealand.

Up to the last 16 of the competition, the cup was run in three regions (northern, central, and southern). National League teams received a bye until the final 64 stage. In all, 147 teams took part in the competition, a new record for the time.

The 1988 final

The final was the third and last to be held over home and away legs. The format was abandoned for the 1989 Chatham Cup as it proved unpopular. The 1988 final was the only one to be decided on the away goals rule, with Waikato United winning after scoring more goals in the first leg in Christchurch, despite both matches ending in draws.

The Christchurch team included Steve Sumner, returning to the city after a spell with Gisborne, and playing for the team he had played against in the 1987 final.

The first leg was held in Christchurch. Waikato took the lead through Steve Tate, and Lance Bauerfeind doubled their advantage. Christchurch scored twice in the last 20 minutes through John Hanson and Johan Verweij.

The two goals scored by Waikato in the first match were to prove invaluable. The second tie, in Hamilton, was evenly balanced. Waikato's Steve Tate again opened the scoring, with a goal after 17 minutes. The away goals rule meant that Christchurch would then need two goals — a 1–1 draw would not be enough. They received only one goal, via a Keith Braithwaite penalty a quarter of an hour before the final whistle.

The Jack Batty Memorial Trophy for player of the final was awarded to double goalscorer Steve Tate of Waikato United.

Results

Third round

* won on penalties by Queens Park (5-4) and South Auckland (4-3)

Fourth round

Fifth round

Sixth Round

Semi-finals

* won on penalties by Waikato United (3-0)

Final

Aggregate score 3-3. Waikato United won on away goals.

References

Rec.Sport.Soccer Statistics Foundation New Zealand 1988 page
UltimateNZSoccer website 1988 Chatham Cup page

Chatham Cup
Chatham Cup
Chatham Cup
Chat